École is a commune in the Savoie department in the Auvergne-Rhône-Alpes region in south-eastern France.

Geography
The village lies in the north-western part of the commune, on the left bank of the Chéran, which forms most of the commune's northern border.

See also
Communes of the Savoie department

References

Communes of Savoie